Mount Barnes is a  mountain summit located within Olympic National Park in Jefferson County of Washington state. Mount Barnes is part of the Bailey Range, which is a subrange of the Olympic Mountains, and is set within the Daniel J. Evans Wilderness. Neighbors include Mount Queets,  to the southwest, and Mount Olympus is set  to the west. Precipitation runoff from the mountain drains west into the Queets River, south into headwaters of the Elwha River, and northeast into Goldie River which is a tributary of the Elwha. Topographic relief is significant as the summit rises 3,200 feet (975 m) above Elwha Basin in approximately two miles.

Etymology

A peak was named by the Seattle Press Expedition to honor Captain Charles Adams Barnes (1859–1900), the expedition's topographer and historian. In December 1889, he and James Halbold Christie, the leader of the expedition, climbed through deep snow to the ridge just north of the peak, and finally laid eyes on the interior of the range which had been a mystery. Barnes wrote of the spectacle: "Range after range of peaks, snow-clad from base to summit, extended as far as the eye could reach, in splendid confusion." That peak is today known instead as Mount Wilder, and the Mount Barnes of today was originally christened "Mt. Childs" by that same expedition. Mount Childs now rises two miles north of Mount Barnes.

Climate

Based on the Köppen climate classification, Mount Barnes is located in the marine west coast climate zone of western North America. Most weather fronts originate in the Pacific Ocean, and travel east toward the Olympic Mountains. As fronts approach, they are forced upward by the peaks of the Olympic Range, causing them to drop their moisture in the form of rain or snowfall (Orographic lift). As a result, the Olympics experience high precipitation, especially during the winter months. During winter months, weather is usually cloudy, but due to high pressure systems over the Pacific Ocean that intensify during summer months, there is often little or no cloud cover during the summer. The months June through August offer the most favorable weather for viewing and climbing.

Geology

The Olympic Mountains are composed of obducted clastic wedge material and oceanic crust, primarily Eocene sandstone, turbidite, and basaltic oceanic crust. The mountains were sculpted during the Pleistocene era by erosion and glaciers advancing and retreating multiple times.

See also

 Olympic Mountains
 Geology of the Pacific Northwest

References

External links
 
 Weather forecast: Mount Barnes
 Charles Adams Barnes: photo

Olympic Mountains
Mountains of Washington (state)
Landforms of Olympic National Park
Mountains of Jefferson County, Washington
North American 1000 m summits